Zell Shaw Blackmon (born May 27, 1973) is an American politician from Georgia. Blackmon is a Republican member of Georgia House of Representatives from the 146th district since 2015.

Shaw Blackmon was raised in Houston County, upon graduating from Warner Robins High School, he attended the University of Georgia where he completed his degree in Management Information Systems.  After college, Shaw moved back to Houston County and began his career working for a small business. He continues to live in Warner Robins with his wife, Whitney, and three children- Ges, Cort and Beckett. 

Shaw has a longstanding role in the community beyond his business initiatives. He has served on the board of the Houston County Development Authority, has been a member of both the Perry Area and Robins Regional Chambers, chairing the Robins Chamber Board of Directors in 2012. In these roles, he has worked to promote new industry, facilitate expansion, and provide mediums from which businesses can broaden their customer base.

Shaw has done foundation work at Central Georgia Technical College and for the Houston County Heritage Foundation, benefiting K-12 public education. As a member of the Technical College System of Georgia State Board, he has worked to provide Georgia with a seamless approach to education by improving transferability between the technical college and the University system, as well as enhancing dual-enrollment opportunities with the Department of Education.

Through continued outreach, Shaw has been involved in the effort to bring investment back to Houston County. This includes funding for the Veteran’s Training Center, a joint project between the Technical College System and University system, and the Health Science facility on the primary campus of Central Georgia Technical College.

Shaw was elected to the 146th District in 2015 and serves on Appropriations, Economic Development & Tourism, Governmental Affairs, Insurance, Juvenile Justice, Rules, Special Rules, Small Business Development, Special Committee on Election Integrity and MARTOC Committees. He also serves as Chair of the Ways & Means Committee, Ex-Officio on the Rural Development Council as well as a House Appointee to the Joint Defense Commission. 

He will continue to focus on the issues near to his heart and his background – strengthening our defense community, enhancing education, and pushing for simple, smart, and effective government that stays out of your way so that Houston County will continue to grow and thrive for future generations.

References

1973 births
Living people
Republican Party members of the Georgia House of Representatives
21st-century American politicians